Jumu'ah Mubārak (Arabic: جمعة مباركة) is a traditional Muslim greeting reserved for use on the Jumu'ah, holiest day of the week on which special congregational prayers are offered. The phrase translates into English as "happy Friday", and can be paraphrased as "have a blessed Friday". Internationally, Muslims use it as a greeting for use on the feast. Fridays are considered a celebration in their own right and Muslims take special care in wearing clean clothes, bathing, and preparing special meals on this day. The term Jumu’ah is derived from the same root from which jama'a is derived, which means "the gathering of people." In the social sense, people take part in Friday prayers in the afternoon during the time the Zuhr prayer would normally be offered.

Meaning

Literal meaning 
Jumu'ah is one of the most exalted Islamic rituals and one of its confirmed obligatory acts. Jumma Mubārak literally means Happy Friday, where Jumma means "Friday" and Mubārak translates as "blessed". Muslims offer weekly prayers on Friday noon which is sacred to their religion and considered holy day according to Islamic beliefs.

Islamic terminate meaning 
According to Hadith, Friday is the best day during which the sun has risen. It's the day Adam was created, the day when Adam entered paradise, and also when he was taken out from it. It's also the day on which the Yawm ad-Din or Day of Resurrection would take place. As this day has its own importance in Islamic religion, Muslims wish each other Jumu'ah Mubārak or Blessed Friday when they go to the Mosque and make a special prayer on that day. When someone wishes “Jummah Mubārak”, Muslims generally just reply back with the same sentence “Jummah Mubārak”.

See also 

 Salah
 Mu'in al-Din Chishti

References

External links 

 Photos: Shia, Sunni Muslims hold joint Friday Prayer in Marneuli, Georgia
 Practical Rulings of Salat al-Jumu’ah
 Friday (jumu'ah) Prayer

Greeting words and phrases
Islamic terminology
Friday observances